Sertan Vardar (born 13 March 1982) is a Turkish former professional footballer who played as a midfielder.

Career
Vardar was a member of the Kardemir Karabükspor side that won the 2009–10 TFF First League.

On 31 August 2016, he joined Bucaspor on a one-year contract.

Honours
 Kardemir Karabükspor
 TFF First League: 2009–10

References

External links
 
 

1982 births
Living people
Footballers from İzmir
Turkish footballers
Bucaspor footballers
Altay S.K. footballers
Mardinspor footballers
Boluspor footballers
Kardemir Karabükspor footballers
Kayseri Erciyesspor footballers
Çaykur Rizespor footballers
Akhisarspor footballers
Gaziantep F.K. footballers
MKE Ankaragücü footballers
Süper Lig players
Association football midfielders